Wolfgang Detmann, better known as Candy de Rouge (sometimes credited as Alexandre DeRouge), is a German (born in Bad Neustadt an der Saale) producer and songwriter. He has worked extensively with the likes of Jennifer Rush, Celine Dion, Bonnie Bianco, Laura Branigan, Thomas Anders, Chris Norman, Falco,  Helen Schneider, Sally Oldfield, The Window Speaks, Sue Schell and other international artists.  He has been credited with co-writing "The Power of Love," which became a massive international success as a single for Rush, Branigan and Dion.

He has more recently being involved with the projects of the Cooltown Studio.

External links
 Swiss Charts
 [ All Music.com]

German record producers
German composers
Living people
Year of birth missing (living people)
People from Bad Neustadt an der Saale